Walcourt is a city and municipality of Wallonia located in the province of Namur, Belgium.

On 1 January 2006, the municipality had 17,516 inhabitants. The total area is 123.18 km2, giving a population density of 142 inhabitants per km2.

The municipality consists of the following districts: Berzée, Castillon, Chastrès, Clermont, Fontenelle, Fraire, Gourdinne, Laneffe, Pry, Rognée, Somzée, Tarcienne, Thy-le-Château, Vogenée, Walcourt, Yves-Gomezée.

History
The Basilica of Saint Maternus is a Gothic minor basilica, founded in 1026. It contains one of the oldest Madonnas in Western Christianity. In 1689, the Battle of Walcourt was fought here between French troops and the Grand Alliance during the Nine Years' War.

See also
 List of protected heritage sites in Walcourt

References

External links
 
Official website (in French)

Cities in Wallonia
Municipalities of Namur (province)